Juan Andrés Sarulyte (born 18 April 1962) is a former Argentine professional football player and currently manager.

On April 23, 2012, he was announced that he will be the assistant coach to complete the coaching squad under the strategist Rubén Israel for the El Salvador national football team, chosen by Executive Comite of FESFUT.

Honours

Manager

Club
Once Municipal
 Primera División
 Runners-up: Apertura 2011

References

External links
 Juan Andrés Sarulyte at BDFA.com.ar 

1962 births
Living people
Argentine football managers
Expatriate football managers in El Salvador